Crambus mozarti is a moth in the family Crambidae. It was described by Graziano Bassi in 2012. It is found in Tanzania.

References

Crambini
Moths described in 2012
Moths of Africa